Broods is a New Zealand musical duo from Nelson, composed of Georgia Josiena Nott on lead vocals, with older brother and multi-instrumentalist Caleb Allan Joseph Nott on production and backing vocals. They released the single "Bridges", which went to No. 8 on the New Zealand singles chart, and signed with Capitol and Polydor Records. They released their self-titled debut EP, Broods, on 30 January 2014, which was followed by a full-length album, Evergreen, on 22 August 2014. The band has toured with Ellie Goulding, Haim, Sam Smith, Tove Lo and Taylor Swift. They have won ten New Zealand Music Awards. On 24 June 2016, Broods released their second album, Conscious. They released their third album Don't Feed the Pop Monster on 1 February 2019.

History

2010–2013: Formation and early years
Born in Nelson, New Zealand, Caleb and Georgia Nott have performed together since childhood. They grew up in a musical family with three other siblings, and would go along with their parents to weddings and church performances. They won a talent competition, "Richmond's Got Talent", as teenagers at Richmond Mall in 2010. While attending Garin College, they were members of the indie rock band, The Peasants, who won the Smokefreerockquest music competition in 2011. The band split in late 2012, shortly after winning a grant from NZ On Air. Georgia began studying popular music at the University of Auckland. Caleb studied industrial design. They both dropped out of university to pursue Broods.

Broods was formed in Auckland in early 2013. The brother-sister project began collaborating with music producer Joel Little, whom they met as a judge at the 2011 Smokefreerockquest. He produced Lorde's 2013 hit single, "Royals". While considering names for the band, their manager suggested Broods. The band liked the double meaning, relating to family and a feeling of brooding in their music. They released their debut single, "Bridges", online in October 2013. The song was picked up by Idolator and other music blogs, earning over 200,000 streams in a week. 
MTV described the track as "a bittersweet synth-pop echo chamber". Broods signed with Capitol Records worldwide and Polydor in the UK and Europe in December 2013.

2014–2015: Broods and Evergreen
The single, "Bridges", debuted at No. 8 in the New Zealand single chart in January 2014 and was chosen as the U.S. iTunes Store single of the week in February 2014. The song, "Never Gonna Change", was made available for streaming in anticipation of their début EP, Broods, which was released on 30 January 2014. The band made their debut U.S. performance at Bardot in Hollywood, California on 24 February 2014, touring as a three piece with James Mataio on drums. They debuted in the UK at London's Notting Hill Arts Club on 5 March 2014, and toured briefly with Haim. They toured North America, and then Australia in support of Ellie Goulding. They returned to the U.S. to make their television début on Late Night with Seth Meyers in July, and toured opening for Sam Smith.

Broods released their début album, Evergreen, on 22 August 2014, which debuted at No. 1 on the New Zealand album chart. They won as Breakthrough Artist of the Year at the 2014 New Zealand Music Awards, and were also nominated for Single of the Year and the People's Choice Award. They were also nominated for the APRA Silver Scroll Award for the single "Bridges". In 2015, they returned to North America for a headlining tour, joined by drummer Joel Farland. The band performed their single "Four Walls" on Conan, and played the Groovin the Moo, Firefly, WayHome, Lollapalooza, and Outside Lands music festivals. They collaborated with Australian singer/songwriter Troye Sivan, co-writing and producing the song "Ease" from his 2015 EP Wild and subsequent album Blue Neighbourhood. At the 2015 New Zealand Music Awards, they won Album of the Year for Evergreen, Best Group, Best Pop Album, and Radio Airplay Record of the Year for "Mother & Father".

2016–2018: Conscious and solo projects
Broods began writing material for a follow up album immediately after releasing their debut. They experimented with adding live instrumentation – guitar, organ and electric piano – to their synthesizer-based electronic sound. The duo released the first single, "Free", on 1 April 2016, working again with producer Joel Little, which has a heavier industrial style. Their second album, Conscious, was released on 24 June 2016, and includes collaborations with Lorde and Tove Lo.

Georgia married long-term partner Jacob Wieblitz in 2016. The couple honeymooned in Bali. Caleb and Georgia moved to Los Angeles in April 2016, and opened again for Ellie Goulding on the North American leg of her Delirium World Tour. Broods appeared on The Late Late Show with James Corden in May, and featured on the Jarryd James single, "1000×", released on 17 June 2016. New Zealand actress Rose McIver appeared in the video for their song "Heartlines". Broods toured Australia, New Zealand, and North America through mid-2016, and were joined by Jarryd James in August. Their cousin, Jonathan Nott, played drums on the tour. BROODS won five New Zealand Music Awards in November, and supported Two Door Cinema Club on tour. They toured Europe with Tove Lo in March 2017. In January 2018, Georgia released a solo album titled The Venus Project. That same month, Caleb released the single "Make Me Feel" under the name Fizzy Milk. In October and November, Broods as opening act joined American singer-songwriter Taylor Swift’s Reputation Stadium Tour during the Oceania leg.

2018–present: Don't Feed the Pop Monster and Space Island
On 8 August 2018, Broods released "Peach" – the first single from their third studio album Don't Feed the Pop Monster. The music video was released on 5 September and offered the first glimpse into the new image that Broods would be presenting. This new image was created by Georgia and Caleb after they were dropped by their label, Capitol Records, following Broods' second album, Conscious. Previously, the creative direction of Broods had been mainly controlled by their label, however, this time around the siblings had full control over how they wanted to present themselves. The band released their third album Don't Feed the Pop Monster on 1 February 2019. In early 2021 they released Guilty Love with Ladyhawke (musician), which went on to feature in Ladyhawke's Time Flies (Ladyhawke album) album. 

A social media post by the band on 1 September 2021 mentioned their fourth album Space Island. They went on to release a trio of singles before the album; "Piece of My Mind", "Heartbreak" and "Like a Woman", all of which follow a story.

Members
Caleb Allan Joseph Nott – born 
Georgia Josiena Nott – born

Discography

Studio albums

Extended plays

Singles

Featured singles

Promotional singles

Other charted songs

Other appearances

Solo projects

Music videos

Notes

Awards and nominations

References

External links

Capitol Records artists
New Zealand musical duos
Musical groups established in 2013
New Zealand pop music groups
New Zealand electronic music groups
New Zealand indie rock groups
MTV Europe Music Award winners
Sibling musical duos
Male–female musical duos
2013 establishments in New Zealand